Admiral general also called general admiral, is a four-star flag officer and the second highest possible rank in the Spanish Navy. Admiral general ranks immediately above admiral and is equivalent to a General of the Army and a General of the Air. There is not equivalent in the Civil Guard or in the Spanish Navy Marines; in both cases the top rank is Lieutenant general.

The rank was created in 1999 to adapt Spain's military ranks to better correspond with those of NATO. It is the highest rank that a Spanish naval officer can reach, as the only higher rank is that of captain general, which can only be held by the king or queen of Spain as commander-in-chief of the country's armed forces (although sometimes it has been given as an honorary rank to some generals).

The admiral general's insignia consists of a baton crossed over a saber under a royal crown. Below this and forming an imaginary diamond, four stars. Furthermore, in the sleeves of the uniform, a twisted rope and over this one three 14mm stripes and a star 50mm away. Being under a Crown means that the rank is part of the generalship (the group of generals of the Armed Forces), the baton and the saber means command and the four stars means the rank of General. This insignia was used before to 1999 by the Head of State as Captain General.

Promotion
Promotion to admiral general is reserved to two positions. These are, the Chief of the Defence Staff and the Chief of Staff of the Navy.

Both positions are appointed by the Spanish government, the first is directly nominated by the Prime Minister and the second is nominated by the Minister of Defense. Being appointed Chief of the Defense Staff means an automatic promotion to the rank of admiral general. The same happens with the Chief of Staff of the Navy with the exception if the official appointed has the rank of vice admiral, in that case, the official needs to be promoted first to admiral.

Living admiral generals
As of September 2018, there are 9 admiral generals alive, these are:

References

Lists of Spanish military personnel
Four-star officers
Spanish admirals